Joseph John Lando (born December 9, 1961) is an American actor, known for playing Jake Harrison on daytime's One Life to Live (1990–1992) and Byron Sully on the television series Dr. Quinn, Medicine Woman (1993–1998).

Life and career
Lando attended Stevenson High School in Lincolnshire, Illinois.

His first acting role was as a patrolman in Star Trek IV: The Voyage Home. He received attention for his role as Jake Harrison in the soap opera One Life to Live, and went on to co-star in the popular drama Dr. Quinn, Medicine Woman as Michaela Quinn's love interest, Byron Sully. He also appeared in the television series Guiding Light and starred in Higher Ground, for which he also served as executive producer. He had a small part in the series Summerland, and appeared in eight episodes of the TV series The Secret Circle as John Blackwell, the father of the main character. In 2014 he joined several Dr. Quinn castmates as they all reprised their roles for the "Funny or Die" parody Dr. Quinn, Morphine Woman.

He has appeared in various feature films, including Seeds of Doubt (1996) and No Code of Conduct (1998). He reunited with Dr. Quinn costar, Jane Seymour, in 2011 for Hallmark Channel's Perfectly Prudence, and again in 2022 for Lifetime's A Christmas Spark.

He was named one of People magazine's 50 Most Beautiful People in the World for 1993.

He and his wife, Kirsten, have been married since 1997 and have four children.

Filmography

References

External links

 Joe Lando on Twitter (official Twitter account)
 Joe Lando Friends (fan site with articles, photos, & interviews)
 Dr. Quinn Medicine Woman  (fan site with behind-the-scenes info and photos)

1961 births
20th-century American male actors
21st-century American male actors
Male actors from Illinois
American male film actors
American male television actors
American male soap opera actors
American people of Italian descent
American people of Polish descent
American people of Russian descent
Living people
People from Lake County, Illinois